Radical is an unincorporated area in Wilkes County, North Carolina.

History
A post office called Radical was established in 1902, and remained in operation until 1948. The origin of the name "Radical" is obscure.

References

Unincorporated communities in Wilkes County, North Carolina
Unincorporated communities in North Carolina